Maria Ford (born 1966) is an American film and television actress, model and dancer. 
Known for her "scream queen" performances in low-budget films of the 1990s, she is one of the main subjects of the 1998 documentary Some Nudity Required. Maria Ford worked extensively as a professional model and professional dancer in 2014-2020, both in the United States and internationally.

Filmography

Film

Television

References

External links
 
 
 Maria Ford Home Page

American film actresses
American television actresses
Living people
Actresses from Los Angeles
21st-century American women
1966 births